The 1835 Maine gubernatorial election took place on September 14, 1835.

Incumbent Democratic Governor Robert P. Dunlap defeated Whig candidate William King.

Results

Notes

References 

Gubernatorial
Maine
1835
September 1835 events